Biju Narayanan is an Indian playback singer active mainly in Malayalam films.

Career 
Biju Narayanan trained in Carnatic music under Aryanad Sadasivan for eight years. He began his music career singing tracks for P. Jayachandran, Unni Menon and KG Markose. He got his first opportunity to sing in a devotional album in 1992, while he was a pre-degree student. He was the winner in the light music category at the M. G. University youth festival and this was a turning point in his career. He began his playback singing career with the song "Pathu Veluppinu" from the 1993 movie Venkalam composed by Raveendran. He was adjudged the best male singer in the State drama awards in 1996.

Family

He married Sreelatha on 23 January 1998 after 21 years together. Aged 44, Sreelatha died from cancer on 13 August 2019. Sreelatha was his classmate in Maharajas College, Eranakulam. The couple has two sons, Sidharth Narayanan& Suryaa Naarayan.

References

External links 
 

Living people
Indian male playback singers
Malayalam playback singers
20th-century Indian singers
Singers from Kochi
20th-century Indian male singers
1970 births